Osgoode (also known as Osgoode Village) is a population centre in Osgoode Ward in the rural south end of Ottawa, Ontario, Canada. It is located just 2 km east of the Rideau River. Until amalgamation in 2001, it was located in Osgoode Township. According to the Canada 2016 Census Osgoode had a population of 2,578.

History
It was originally  part of Osgoode Township but it became part of Ottawa in 2001. Originally called Osgoode Station, its name was shortened to Osgoode in 1962.

The community took its name from William Osgoode, the first Chief Justice of Upper Canada.

Present day
Notable landmarks of the community include the Stuart Holmes Arena for ice hockey, the Osgoode Community Centre and its surrounding recreation facilities, the local mall, and numerous shops within the village.

In popular culture
In the 2020 American disaster film Greenland, starring Gerard Butler, several private planes leave from Osgoode to take refugees to Thule Air Base in Greenland.

References

External links
 Osgoode Village Community Association

Neighbourhoods in Ottawa
Osgoode Station
Populated places disestablished in 2001